Mima Jaušovec defeated Florența Mihai in the final, 6–2, 6–7(5–7), 6–1 to win the women's singles tennis title at the 1977 French Open.

Sue Barker was the reigning champion, but chose not to defend her title.

Seeds
The seeded players are listed below. Mima Jaušovec is the champion; others show the round in which they were eliminated.

 Mima Jaušovec (champion)
 Kathy May (quarterfinals)
 Helga Masthoff (third round)
 Regina Maršíková (semifinals)
 Renáta Tomanová (quarterfinals)
 Lesley Hunt (first round)
 Janet Newberry (semifinals)
 Nancy Richey (third round)

Qualifying

Draw

Key
 Q = Qualifier
 WC = Wild card
 LL = Lucky loser
 r = Retired

Finals

Earlier rounds

Section 1

Section 2

Section 3

Section 4

References

External links
1977 French Open – Women's draws and results at the International Tennis Federation

Women's Singles
French Open by year – Women's singles
French Open - Women's Singles
1977 in women's tennis
1977 in French women's sport